The following is a list of events affecting Canadian television in 1968. Events listed include television show debuts, finales, cancellations, and channel launches, closures and rebrandings.

Events

Debuts

Ending this year

Television shows

1950s
Country Canada (1954–2007)
CBC News Magazine (1952–1981)
Chez Hélène (1959–1973)
Circle 8 Ranch (1955–1978)
Don Messer's Jubilee (1957–1969)
The Friendly Giant (1958–1985)
Hockey Night in Canada (1952–present)
The National (1954–present)
Front Page Challenge (1957–1995)
Wayne and Shuster Show (1958–1989)

1960s
CTV National News (1961–present)
Elwood Glover's Luncheon Date (1963–1975)
Land and Sea (1964–present)
Magistrate's Court (1963–1969)
Man Alive (1967–2000)
Mr. Dressup (1967–1996)
Music Hop (1962–1972)
The Nature of Things (1960–present, scientific documentary series)
People in Conflict (1962–1970)
The Pierre Berton Show (1962–1973)
The Pig and Whistle (1967–1977)
Quentin Durgens, M.P. (1965–1969)
Question Period (1967–present, news program)
Reach for the Top (1961–1985)
Rocket Robin Hood (1966–1969)
Singalong Jubilee (1961–1974)
Take 30 (1962–1983)
Telescope (1963–1973)
The Tommy Hunter Show (1965–1992)
University of the Air (1966–1983)
W-FIVE (1966–present, newsmagazine program)

TV movies

Television stations

Debuts

See also
 1968 in Canada
 List of Canadian films

References